Arkansas Highway 170 (AR 170, Hwy. 170) is a designation for two state highways in Washington County, Arkansas. The main segment of  runs from Devil's Den State Park to West Fork. A shorter segment of  runs from U.S. Route 62 (US 62) through Appleby before reconnecting with US 62.

Route description

Devil's Den State Park to West Fork
AR 170 begins at a three-way junction with AR 74 and AR 220 in Devil's Den State Park. The route runs north, winding through steep Ozark topography. AR 170 serves as the southern terminus of AR 265 near the SEFOR reactor. The highway continues north through rural country, crossing over I-49. East of the expressway, AR 170 enters West Fork. The route enters town as Phillips St, turns south onto McKnight St, and turns left onto Main St. AR 170 continues to US Route 71, where the route terminates.

Walnut Grove to Farmington
AR 170 begins at US 62 at Walnut Grove (northeast of Prairie Grove) and runs north/northeast to US 62 in Farmington. The route runs over the Cane Hill Road Bridge, and serves Appleby.

History
The highway was created between 1936 and 1937 as a semicircle loop from Winslow to US 71 near West Fork via Devil's Den State Park.

In Farmington, AR 170 follows the original 1926 alignment of AR 45 which later became US 62.

Major intersections

See also

References

External links

170
Transportation in Washington County, Arkansas